Caetano Prósperi Calil (born 20 May 1984) is a Brazilian former footballer who played as a midfielder or forward.

Personal life
Calil also holds an Italian passport.

Career
Calil signed a six-month contract with Ipatinga in 2007.

Italy
He joined Fiorentina on 4 July 2007 as a free agent. However, half of his contractual rights were then sold to A.C. Siena for €350,000. Calil only played twice in 2007–08 Serie A. In June 2008 the co-ownership deal was renewed.

In summer 2008, Crotone acquired half of his registration rights from la Viola for €150,000, Siena retaining the second half.

In June 2009 Siena bought him back from Crotone for €300,000 but resold to Frosinone in co-ownership deal for €450,000. On 24 June 2010, Frosinone acquired Caetano outright for another €450,000, and Gianluca Sansone in co-ownership deal for €400,000, and sold Gennaro Troianiello to Siena for €2 million.

In summer 2011 Calil was re-signed by F.C. Crotone for an undisclosed fee.

In summer 2013 Calil was signed by Serie B club Varese for free.

On 23 August 2014 Calil was signed by Lega Pro club Salernitana in a 2-year contract. The club won promotion to Serie B.

On 31 August 2015 Catania (which relegated from Serie B to Lega Pro due to a match-fixing scandal) signed Caetano, Andrea Russotto and keeper Luca Liverani, with Alberto Frison and Moses Odjer (loan) moved to opposite direction.

On 31 January 2017 Calil, on a temporary basis, moved to Livorno.

On 10 August 2018 he moved to Malta, signing with Ħamrun Spartans.

On 2 September 2019 he returned to Italy, joining Paganese.

Honours
Varese
 Lega Pro: 2015

References

External links
 
 
 

1984 births
Living people
Brazilian footballers
Association football midfielders
Brazilian expatriate footballers
Brazil youth international footballers
Brazilian people of Italian descent
Brazilian people of Syrian descent
Cruzeiro Esporte Clube players
Santos FC players
A.C.N. Siena 1904 players
Club Athletico Paranaense players
Avaí FC players
ACF Fiorentina players
S.S.D. Varese Calcio players
Ipatinga Futebol Clube players
F.C. Crotone players
Frosinone Calcio players
Ħamrun Spartans F.C. players
Paganese Calcio 1926 players
Serie A players
Serie B players
Serie C players
Maltese Premier League players
Expatriate footballers in Italy
Expatriate footballers in Malta
Brazilian expatriate sportspeople in Italy
Sportspeople from Minas Gerais